Portage Canal is a canal in Portage, Wisconsin.

Portage Canal may also refer to:

 Portage Canal (Michigan), part of the Keweenaw Waterway
 Port Townsend Ship Canal, a canal in Washington